Prionurus scalprum is a subtropical fish found in coral reefs in the northwest Pacific Ocean. It is commonly known as the Scalpel sawtail. It is sometimes used in aquariums.

References

Fish described in 1835
Prionurus